A number of cross symbols were developed for the purpose of the emerging system of heraldry, which appeared in Western Europe in about 1200. This tradition is partly in the use of the Christian cross an emblem from the 11th century, and increasingly during the age of the Crusades. Many cross variants were developed in the classical tradition of heraldry during the late medieval and early modern periods. Heraldic crosses are inherited in modern iconographic traditions and are used in numerous national flags.

History
The Christian cross emblem (Latin cross or Greek cross) was used from the 5th century, deriving from a T-shape representing the gibbet (stauros, crux) of the crucifixion of Jesus in use from at least the 2nd century. The globus cruciger and the staurogram is used in Byzantine coins and seals during the Heraclian period (6th century). Under the Heraclian dynasty (7th century), coins also depict simply crosses potent, patty, or pommy.

The cross was used as a field sign by the Christian troops during the Crusades. In 1188, Kings Henry II of England and Philip II of France agreed to launch the Third Crusade together, and that Henry would use a white cross and Philip a red cross. The red-on-white cross came to be used by the Knights Templar, and the white-on-red one by the Knights Hospitaller (also white-on-black); the Teutonic Order used a black-on white version. Early cross or spiral-like shield decorations, not necessarily with Christian symbolism, are already found on depictions of shields of the 11th century.

Heraldry emerged in western Europe at the start of the 13th century out of earlier traditions. The basic variants of the red-on-white (termed the Cross of Saint George) and the white-on-red crusaders' cross were continued independently in the flags of various states in the 13th and 14th century, including the Duchy of Genoa, the Electorate of Trier, the Bishopric of Constance and the Kingdoms of England and Georgia, which last two had special devotions to St George. on one hand; and Savoy, the war flag of the Holy Roman Empire and (possibly from the latter) Switzerland and Denmark on the other.

The cross appears as heraldic charge in the oldest rolls of arms, from about 1250. A roll of arms of the 13th century (the reign of Henry III of England) lists the coats of arms of various noblemen distinguished by crosses of different tinctures:
Le Conte de Norffolk, d'or a ung crois de goulez (viz. red on gold);
Piers de Sauvoye, goules ung crois d'argent (white on red): this is attributed, Peter's funerary monument displays an eagle on his shield;
Robert de Veer d'argent a la crois de goulz (red on white).
Glover's Roll (British Museum Add MS 29796), a 16th-century copy of a roll of arms of the 1250s has depictions of various heraldic crosses, including 
the or a cross gules of the earl of Norfolk, 
gules, a cross argent of Peter of Savoy, 
argent a cross gules of Robert de Veer,
gules a cross flory vair of Guillaume de Forz, Comte d'Aumale,
gules a cross fleury argent of Guillaume Vescy,
gules a cross saltire engrele of Fulke de Escherdestone,
argent a cross fleury azure of John Lexington,
azure three crosses or of William de Sarren,
or a cross gules, five scallops argent of Ralph Bigod,
gules a cross fourchy argent of Gilbert de Vale,
argent a cross fleury sable of John Lamplowe,
or a cross saltire gules, a chief gules of Robert de Brus,
gules a cross saltire argent of Robert de Neville, or a cross voided gules of Hamond (Robert) de Crevecoeur,
and azure a cross or, four lions rampant or of Baudouin Dakeney. In addition, the Glover Roll has semy of crosses crosslet as a tincture in several coats of arms.

The desire to distinguish one's coat of arms from others led to a period of substantial innovation in producing variants of the basic Christian cross by the early 14th century (in England, the reign of Edward II).

The great number of variants of crosses, and the deep history of such variants (going back to the 14th century or earlier) results in confusing and often contradictory terminology.

In the heraldry of the Holy Roman Empire, the cross is comparatively rare in the coats of arms of noble families, presumably because the plain heraldic cross was seen as an imperial symbol (for the same reason, the eagle was rarely used as a charge because it represented the empire), but in the 14th century the plain cross is used in the seals and flags of several prince-bishoprics, including Trier, Constance and Cologne.

Looking back on the Crusades as the foundational period of knighthood, the badge of the cross became strongly associated with the idealized Christian knight of romance, as expressed by Spenser (Faerie Queene book 1, canto 1):

The black-on-white cross worn by the Teutonic Knights was granted by Innocent III in 1205. The coat of arms representing the grand master (Deutschmeisterwappen) is shown with a golden cross fleury or cross potent superimposed on the black cross, with the imperial eagle as a central inescutcheon. The golden cross fleury overlaid on the black cross becomes widely used in the 15th century. A legendary account attributes its introduction to Louis IX of France, who on 20 August 1250 granted the master of the order this cross as a variation of the Jerusalem cross, with the fleur-de-lis symbol attached to each arm. While this legendary account cannot be traced back further than the early modern period (Christoph Hartknoch, 1684) there is some evidence that the design does indeed date to the mid 13th century. The black cross patty was later used for military decoration and insignia by the Kingdom of Prussia and gave rise to the cross patty in the German Reichskriegsflagge and the Iron Cross and Pour le Mérite orders.

The Nordic cross is an 18th-century innovation derived from cross flags adapted as swallow-tailed (or triple-tailed) pennons
used as civil ensigns; the first official introduction of such a flag was in a regulation of 11 June 1748 describing the Danish civil ensign (Koffardiflaget) for merchant ships. The Danish design was adopted for the flags of Norway (civil ensign 1821) and Sweden (1906), both derived from a common ensign used during the Union between Sweden and Norway 1818–1844, Iceland (1915) and Finland (1917).

Ordinary cross

The blazon Cross without any addition signifies a heraldic ordinary, a pale and a fess of equal widths conjoined, the width being typically one-fifth of the shield (or one third of the shield when charges are placed on the cross). The four arms should be of equal length (forming a Greek cross), as far as possible within the shape of the shield, and they meet in the center (fesse-point) of the shield, except when it is abased (lowered) in the presence of a chief. The plain cross of gules in a field argent is termed Saint George's Cross.

The ordinary formed when the cross' arms are oblique, passing through the top corners of the shield, is referred to as a saltire.

The ordinary cross may further be modify in its flection (i.e. modification of its edges as engrailed (engreslée), embattled (bretessée), indented (denchée), invected (cannelée), wavy, (ondée), raguly (écotée), dancetty or dantelly (denché, émanchée), and so on. French heraldic terminology is even more diverse, with many synonyms leading to some confusion. 

The ordinary cross may also be varied in its tincture, it may be party, or chequy, compony, counter-compony, fretty, trellised, vair maçonnée and so on. It may also be of two tinctures, e.g. party per fesse, per pale, or per cross (equivalent to quarterly), mostly in connection with the partition of the field (i.e. counter-charged).

The term quarter-pierced (quarterly pierced) is used when the center of the cross has a separate tincture. Some heraldists have used quarter-voided or square-pierced for cases where the center of the cross is given the tincture of the field, or alternatively chequy of nine panes (French équipollée). A cross quadrate has a square at the intersection point.

The cross voided (also une fausse croix) has the same tincture of the field with only a narrow border outlining the limbs. This is equivalent to superimposing one cross upon another (croix chargée, or remplie) when the second cross is of the tincture of the field.

A voided cross might also be blazoned as fimbriated. Fimbriated crosses are more common in vexillology, e.g. the fimbriated crosses in the national flags of the United Kingdom, of Norway and of Iceland. The German Balkenkreuz, introduced originally as identification for German Luftstreitkräfte in 1918 and later used as a vehicle emblem by the Wehrmacht, if used heraldically might be blazoned as a cross double fimbriated, or as a voided cross superimposed by a second cross. The "Bundeswehr cross" is a variant of the Balkenkreuz using a cross patty.

Named variants

Equal limbs

Unequal limbs

Additional charges
In some cases, a separate name is given to the ensemble of a heraldic cross with four additional charges in the angles.

Flags 

Flags with crosses are recorded from the later Middle Ages, e.g. in the early 14th century the insignia cruxata comunis of the city of Genoa, the red-on-white cross that would later become known as St George's Cross, and the white-on-red cross of the Reichssturmfahne used as the war flag of the Holy Roman Emperor possibly from the early 13th century.

Crosses on flags become more widespread in the Age of Sail, as maritime flags, and from this tradition develop into national flags in the 18th to 19th century, the British Union flag (as naval flag) was introduced in 1606, after the Union of the Crowns. The Nordic cross is a modern cross variant used on rectangular flags only, introduced for rectangular civil ensigns for Denmark in 1748. This is to be distinguished from the (rare) heraldic charge of a horizontal Latin cross, known as the "Cross of Saint Philip".

Several national flags are based on late medieval war flags, including the white-on-red crosses of the flag of Denmark and the flag of Switzerland. The elongated Nordic cross originates in the 18th century due to the rectangular shape of maritime flags.

The Red Cross flag originates in 1906 as a colour-switched version of the flag of Switzerland.

Further reading

See also
St. Andrew's Cross

References

External links

 
Christian symbols
Heraldic charges